Shep may refer to:

People

Given name
Shep Fields, American band leader
Shep Goodman, American music producer and songwriter
Shep Gordon, American talent manager, Hollywood film agent, and producer
Shep Mayer, Canadian ice hockey player
Shep Messing (born 1949), American Olympic soccer goalkeeper and current broadcaster
Shep Meyers, American pianist, composer, arranger and conductor
Shep Pettibone (born 1959), American  music producer, remixer, songwriter and club DJ
Shepard "Shep" Smith, American broadcast journalist

Surname
David Shepherd (umpire), English cricket umpire
James Sheppard, lead singer of the Heartbeats and later Shep and the Limelites
Jean Shepherd (born 1921), American raconteur, radio and TV personality, writer and actor
Shep Shepherd, American jazz musician

Dogs
Shep (American dog), a dog that lived in the Great Northern train station in Fort Benton, Montana, in the late 1930s
Shep (British dog), a Blue Peter dog, a border collie, remembered by British TV viewers as inseparable from John Noakes
Shep (Thanhouser Collie), a dog which became known for appearances in Thanhouser films of the silent period

Other
Shep, George of the Jungle's elephant companion
Shep, a fictional character from the animated movie Interstella 5555: The 5tory of the 5ecret 5tar 5ystem
"Old Shep", a song